Mike Alston (born August 28, 1985) is a former American football fullback/linebacker. Alston was signed by the Cleveland Browns of the National Football League as an undrafted free agent in 2007. Alston completed his college career at Toledo.

On March 5, 2015, Alston was assigned to the Cleveland Gladiators.

External links
 Spokane Shock Bio
 Mahoning Valley Thunder Bio

1985 births
Living people
Players of American football from Columbus, Ohio
American football fullbacks
American football linebackers
Toledo Rockets football players
Cleveland Browns players
Spokane Shock players
Chicago Rush players
Mahoning Valley Thunder players
Utah Blaze players
New Orleans VooDoo players
Cleveland Gladiators players